Gapa Hele Bi Sata is a 2015 Indian Odia-language drama featured film directed by Murali Krishna. The film stars Anubhav Mohanty and Barsha Priyadarshini is in the film as lead cast. Prem Anand is the music director. The movie is a remake of 2013 Kannada movie Charminar. This film released on Raja alongside Super Michhua and Love You Hamesha. The film was a box office failure.

Cast
 Anubhav Mohanty
 Barsha Priyadarshini
 Dipika Tripathy
 Mihir Das 
 Bikash Das
 Salil Mitra

References

External links
 

2015 films
2010s Odia-language films
Odia remakes of Kannada films